Chan Suet Ying, Peony (born August 27, 1985 in Hong Kong) is a Chinese short-track speed skater.

References

1985 births
Living people
Hong Kong male short track speed skaters
Short track speed skaters at the 2007 Asian Winter Games